The Guianese Socialist Party (PSG) is a political party in the French overseas région of French Guiana, in South America.

History
It was founded in 1956 by Justin Catayée, beforehand the founder of the Guianese federation of the French Section of the Workers' International (SFIO). It is a separate party, not to be confused with the departmental federation of the French Socialist Party. For instance, the PSG endorsed the overseas list of Europe Ecology – The Greens, not the PS one, in the 2004 European elections.

The PSG candidate Gabriel Serville won one of the two parliamentary seats for French Guiana at the French National Assembly in 2012, the second one was held in 2007-2017 by a non-PSG deputy, Chantal Berthelot, endorsed by various parties, among whom the PSG.

The PSG was until 2010 a major party in the regional council of French Guiana, when it fell from 17 seats to one out of 31. It controls since then only the Cayenne municipality. The PSG didn't compete as such for the December 2015 first Guianese Assembly elections after the merger of the department and the region, and the coalition list it supported, headed by deputy Chantal Berthelot from another left-wing party, got only 8.49% and was eliminated at the first round.

Rodolphe Alexandre, then PSG first alderman in Cayenne, was excluded from the party in January 2008 for presenting a list against the incumbent PSG mayor. He won the 2008 municipal election and became mayor, then won the 2010 regional elections and became president of the Regional Council, likewise for the 2015 Guianese Assembly.

Electoral results

French legislative elections
French Guiana sends two deputies in Paris since 1988, beforehand only one. The electoral districts borders were considerably modified before the 2012 elections.

Guianese Assembly elections
For the first elections to the Guianese Assembly in December 2015, the PSG did not compete as such but on a common list Cultiver la Guyane led by the deputy Chantal Berthelot of the party To the Left in Guiana (AGEG). The list got 8.49% of the votes in the first round, under the 10% threshold needed to access to the second round. Only two lists could compete for the second round and both their leaders refused any merger with lists that had got between 5% and 10% for the first round, thus eliminating from the new assembly the PSG, but also all the other parties hitherto represented in one or both previous councils: AGEG, Walwari (Christiane Taubira's party), MDES and LR.

Regional elections

Office holders

Deputies
Single electoral district
Justin Catayée (1958–1962)
Léopold Héder (1962–1967)
Elie Castor (1981–1986)

Two districts
Elie Castor (District 1, 1986–1993)
Gabriel Serville (District 1, 2012–2017)

General councillors
French Guiana had a General Council like any other French department from 1946 until January 1, 2016 when it was replaced by the Guianese Assembly. The 19 general councillors were elected for six years but elections took place every three years for half of the cantons.

Mayors of Cayenne
Léopold Héder (March 1965 – June 1978)
Gérard Holder (June 1978 – June 1995)
Jean-Claude Lafontaine (June 1995 – March 2008)
Marie-Laure Phinéra-Horth (April 2010 – 2020)

Other mayors
There are 22 municipalities in French Guiana, eleven of whom had at least once since 1971 a PSG mayor, seven, including Cayenne, still had one after the 2014 municipal elections.
Serge Adelson, mayor of Saint-Élie (1971–1983), then of Macouria (1983–2012)
Elie Castor, mayor of Sinnamary (1977–1996)
Paul Dolianki, mayor of Apatou (2008–)
Georges Elfort, mayor of Saint-Georges (1994–1998, 2014–)
Jean-Marcel Ganty, mayor of Remire-Montjoly (2007–)
Paul Martin, mayor of Grand-Santi (2001–)
Georges Patient, mayor of Mana (1989–), senator since 2008
Paul Suitman, mayor of Camopi (1985–1992)
Gabriel Serville, mayor of Matoury (2014–), deputy since 2012
Raymond Tarcy, mayor of Saint-Laurent-du-Maroni (1971–1983)

Notes

References

Political parties in French Guiana
Socialism in French Guiana
Social democratic parties in France